The Son is a 2022 drama film directed by Florian Zeller from a screenplay written by himself and Christopher Hampton. It is based on Zeller's 2018 stage play of the same name, which is framed as a prequel to The Father, with Hopkins reprising his role as Anthony, and Zeller returning as writer and director. The film stars Hugh Jackman, Laura Dern, Vanessa Kirby, Zen McGrath, Hugh Quarshie, and Anthony Hopkins.

The Son had its world premiere at the 79th Venice International Film Festival on 7 September 2022, and was released for a one-week limited theatrical release in New York City and Los Angeles on 25 November 2022, before a wide release in the United States on 20 January 2023 by Sony Pictures Classics. The film received mixed reviews from critics, though Jackman's performance received praise. At the 80th Golden Globe Awards and 27th Satellite Awards, Jackman was nominated for Best Actor in a Motion Picture – Drama.

Plot
Peter Miller (Hugh Jackman) is recently married to his second wife, Beth (Vanessa Kirby), and raising their newborn son. His ex-wife, Kate (Laura Dern), unexpectedly shows up and says their 17-year-old son, Nicholas (Zen McGrath), is depressed and has dropped out of school. Although Peter barely knows Nicholas, he agrees to house him. Peter has a terrible relationship with his own father (Anthony Hopkins), who was cruel when he wasn't absent from Peter's life. However, Peter has moved on from his childhood trauma and hopes to be a good father to Nicholas.

Peter refuses to acknowledge that he has deeply wounded Nicholas by cheating on Kate. But when Nicholas attempts suicide and is placed in an in-patient treatment facility, Peter belatedly grasps his responsibility for the situation.

Peter and Kate bring Nicholas home a week later after feeling sympathetic to his pleas that he regrets the decisions that led to the facility. Once back home, Nicholas makes tea for his parents and happily talks about seeing a movie as a family. As he leaves to shower and his parents discuss how things seem better, Nicholas shoots himself. Peter fantasizes about what life would be like had Nicholas lived.

Cast
 Hugh Jackman as Peter Miller
 Laura Dern as Kate Miller
 Vanessa Kirby as Beth
 Zen McGrath as Nicholas Miller
 George Cobell as young Nicholas Miller
 Hugh Quarshie as Doctor Harris
 Anthony Hopkins as Anthony Miller, Peter's father

Production
During an interview via Zoom after the 93rd Academy Awards nominations were announced, director/writer Florian Zeller revealed to Deadline Hollywood that he was finishing up an adaptation of one of his plays titled The Son. In April 2021, Hugh Jackman and Laura Dern were cast to star in the film. In June 2021, Vanessa Kirby joined the cast of the film.

Principal photography began in August 2021. As of October 2021, production had concluded. It was reported Anthony Hopkins and Zen McGrath had also joined the cast, the former of whom is reuniting with Zeller after working on The Father (2020), for which he won the Academy Award for Best Actor.

Release
In July 2021, Sony Pictures Classics acquired distribution rights to the film. STX Entertainment claimed the distribution rights for the UK, Benelux, Italy, Scandinavia and Iceland that same month. Despite STX's main international office in London shutting down, the company managed to release the film in the aforementioned territories.

The film had its world premiere in-competition at the 79th Venice International Film Festival on 7 September 2022. Its North American premiere took place at the Toronto International Film Festival that same month on 12 September 2022. It also screened at the 2022 AFI Fest on 5 November 2022. The film was initially scheduled for a limited release in the United States on 11 November 2022, with expansions in the following weeks, before its limited release was shifted to 25 November. Its US limited release was later shifted again to a one-week engagement from 25 November, only in limited New York City and Los Angeles theaters, before a nationwide release on 20 January 2023. Although initially planned for 8 March 2023, the film was released in France on 1 March 2023.

Reception
On Rotten Tomatoes, the film holds an approval rating of 29%, based on 171 reviews, with an average rating of 4.8/10. The website's consensus reads: "Despite reliably solid work from Laura Dern and Hugh Jackman, The Son remains mired in off-puttingly aggressive melodrama." Metacritic assigned the film a weighted average score of 45 out of 100, based on 46 critics, indicating "mixed or average reviews".

Accolades

References

External links
 

American drama films
British drama films
French drama films
British films based on plays
French films based on plays
Sony Pictures Classics films
Films directed by Florian Zeller
Films scored by Hans Zimmer
American prequel films
British prequel films
French prequel films
2020s British films
2020s French films
2020s American films